Lorenzo Lippi (3 May 1606 – 15 April 1665) was an Italian painter and poet from Florence.

Biography 
Born in Florence, he studied painting under Matteo Rosselli. Both Baldassare Franceschini and Francesco Furini were also apprenticed with Rosselli, the influence of whose style, and more especially of that of Santi di Tito, is to be traced in Lippi's works, which are marked by taste, delicacy and a strong turn for portrait-like naturalism. His maxim was to poetize as he spoke, and to paint as he saw. His biography was recounted by Filippo Baldinucci.

After painting for some time in Florence, and having married at the age of forty the daughter of the rich sculptor named Giovanni Francesco Susini, Lippi went as court painter to Innsbruck, where he has left many excellent portraits.

In Innsbruck, he wrote his humorous poem named Malmantile Racquistato, which was published under the anagrammatic pseudonym of Perlone Zipoli. The Malmantile Racquistato is a mock-heroic romance, mostly compounded out of a variety of popular tales; its principal subject matter is an expedition for the recovery of a fortress and territory whose queen had been expelled by a female usurper. It is full of graceful or racy Florentine idioms, and is counted by Italians as a testo di lingua. Lippi is remembered more for this poem than by his paintings. It was published posthumously in 1688.

Lippi was somewhat self-sufficient and arrogant, and, when visiting Parma, would not look at the famous paintings by Correggio there, saying that they could teach him nothing. He died of pleurisy in 1664, in Florence. The most esteemed works of Lippi as a painter are a Crucifixion in the Uffizi gallery at Florence, and a Triumph of David which he executed for the salon of Angiolo Galli, introducing into it portraits of the seventeen children of the owner. Among his pupils is Bartolomeo Bimbi.

He should not be confused with the Quattrocento-Renaissance, father-son pair of Florentine painters Filippo and Filippino Lippi, or with Italian poet Lorenzo Lippi da Colle (1440–85).

Gallery

References

 Monograph on Lippi

External links 
 

1606 births
1665 deaths
17th-century Italian painters
Italian male painters
Painters from Florence
Italian poets
Italian male poets
Court painters